Monocarboxylate transporter 10 (MCT 10), also known as aromatic amino acid transporter 1 and T-type amino acid transporter 1 (TAT1) and solute carrier family 16 member 10 (SLC16A10), is a protein that in humans is encoded by the SLC16A10 gene. SLC16A10 is a member of the solute carrier family.

Function 

SLC16A10 mediates Na+-independent transport of tryptophan, tyrosine, phenylalanine, and L-DOPA.

See also
 Blue diaper syndrome

References

Further reading

Solute carrier family